Marshal of Italy was a rank in the Royal Italian Army (Regio Esercito).  Originally created in 1924 by Italian dictator Benito Mussolini for the purpose of honoring Generals Luigi Cadorna and Armando Diaz, the rank was granted to several other general officers from 1926 to 1943.  The rank was the highest in the Italian Army prior to the creation of the rank of First Marshal of the Empire in 1938.  The rank of Marshal of Italy was abolished in 1946 with the creation of the Italian Republic.  The equivalent Royal Navy (Regia Marina) rank was Grand Admiral (Grande Ammiraglio), while the equivalent Air Force (Regia Aeronautica) rank was Marshal of the Air Force (Maresciallo dell'Aria).

The rank was formally abolished on 18 January 1947 by the Provisional Head of State Enrico de Nicola.

Lists of the Marshals of Italy

Gallery

See also
Marshal (Italy) – an intermediate rank between sergeants and officers.
First marshal of the empire
Italo Balbo – Marshal of the Air Force
Paolo Thaon di Revel – Grand Admiral

References

Military ranks of Italy